Charbakh Yerevan Futsal Club, is an Armenian professional futsal club, currently playing in the Armenian Futsal Premier League.

History
Charbakh Yerevan Futsal Club was founded in 2015 in the Charbakh neighborhood of Shengavit District within the capital Yerevan. The club participated in the 2015-16 season of the Armenian Futsal Premier League, occupying the 2nd place among 7 participants in their inaugural season. They currently play their home games at the Mika Sports Arena, Yerevan.

Season by season

References

Charbakh
Sport in Yerevan
2015 establishments in Armenia
Futsal clubs established in 2015